Chestnut (or Dove's Figary) is an English country dance from The Dancing Master collection.

Dance 
English country dance for three couples in a line, recorded by John Playford, 1651.

Tune

Instructions 
reconstructed by Delbert von Straßburg and Stephen Fischer

References

External links
 'Chestnut' from Estienne's country dance book
 'Chestnut (or Doves Figary)' from Facsimile of John Playford's 1651 The English Dancing Master

English country dance
Partner dance
Dance forms in classical music